Mae Hotely (October 7, 1872 – April 6, 1954) was an American silent film actress. She appeared in more than 80 films between 1911 and 1929. Born in Maryland as Maye Shearor, in August 1902 she married the film director Arthur Hotaling, creating her stage name as a play on his.  She died in Coronado, California.

Selected filmography
 Her Choice (1915)
 Matilda's Legacy (1915)
 A Lucky Strike (1915)
 Baby (1915)
 The Twin Sister (1915)
 What He Forgot (1915)
 Who's Boss? (1914)
 Long May It Wave (1914)
 The Female Cop (1914)
 Building a Fire (1914)
 Casey's Birthday (1914)

References

External links

1872 births
1954 deaths
American film actresses
20th-century American actresses